Lee Hyun-jin (born March 5, 1985) is a South Korean actor. He is best known for his roles in the films Boy Meets Boy, Chubby Revolution, and the television series' Heartstrings, Operation Proposal, and Sky Castle.

He made his stage debut in Audacious Romance after being encouraged by Kim Su-ro.

Filmography

Television series

Film

Web series

Music video

Theater

Awards and nominations

References

External links
Lee Hyun-jin Fan Cafe at Daum 

1985 births
Living people
South Korean male television actors
South Korean male film actors
South Korean male stage actors